Patients For Affordable Drugs Now is a patient advocacy and lobbying organisation based in Washington, D.C., founded by David Mitchell who suffers from multiple myeloma.  Lucy Westerfield is the Deputy Executive Directory and Chief of Staff. It focuses on policies to lower drug prices.

It is financed by the Action Now Initiative (ANI) which is funded by the Laura and John Arnold Foundation. It is bipartisan and does not accept funding from any organizations that profit from development or distribution of prescription drugs.

Patients For Affordable Drugs Now has a separate political action arm called Patients for Affordable Drugs Action. It spent about $10 million to highlight drug prices as an issue in the 2018 United States elections.

In March 2019 Mitchell welcomed the suggestion that drug companies should be made to disclose the prices of their products in television commercials but said “We have not seen any evidence that it will lower drug prices."

When Eli Lilly and Company announced a halving of the price of insulin lispro Wakana denounced the move as a "token PR play".

It supports the proposal for a Prescription Drug Affordability Board as is being considered in Maryland and similar proposals made in Washington.

In 2022 it pointed out that the price of Humalog,  Eli Lilly's insulin had increased from $20 in 1996 to $275.

References

External links 

 Official website

Lobbying organizations in the United States
Organizations based in Washington, D.C.
Pharmacy organizations in the United States